Sonus Quartet is a Los Angeles-based string quartet whose members include Caroline Campbell (violin I), Kathleen Sloan (violin II), Neel Hammond (viola), and Vanessa Freebairn-Smith (cello). Freebairn-Smith and Hammond formed Sonus Quartet in 2003.

Composition
Sonus has composed arrangements which have been featured on John Frusciante's The Empyrean, Van Hunt's On The Jungle Floor and Martina Topley-Bird's The Blue God, as well as albums by Boyz II Men and One Eskimo. Sonus performs often in L.A., at venues such as The Bootleg Theater, Room 5, Molly Malone's, as well as Walt Disney Concert Hall. They include a variety of repertoire from original Sonus arrangements of classical pieces such as a 15th-century madrigal or a Shostakovich quartet, to popular music from The Cure or Clint Mansell’s Lux Aeterna.

Film
Sonus has played live with film composer Clint Mansell and contributed to the recording of Mansell's score for the film Moon (2009).

References

External links
 Sonus Quartet Official website
Sonus Quartet Tours With GRAMMY® Award Winning Gnarls Barkley. (2007, March 9). Yamaha Press Release.

American string quartets
Musical groups from Los Angeles
Musical groups established in 2003